In statistics and computational geometry, the notion of  centerpoint is a generalization of the median to data in higher-dimensional Euclidean space.  Given a set of points in d-dimensional space, a centerpoint of the set is a point such that any hyperplane that goes through that point divides the set of points in two roughly equal subsets: the smaller part should have at least a 1/(d + 1) fraction of the points.  Like the median, a centerpoint need not be one of the data points.  Every non-empty set of points (with no duplicates) has at least one centerpoint.

Related concepts 
Closely related concepts are the Tukey depth of a point (the minimum number of sample points on one side of a hyperplane through the point) and a Tukey median of a point set (a point maximizing the Tukey depth). A centerpoint is a point of depth at least n/(d + 1), and a Tukey median must be a centerpoint, but not every centerpoint is a Tukey median. Both terms are named after John Tukey.

For a different generalization of the median to higher dimensions, see geometric median.

Existence 
A simple proof of the existence of a centerpoint may be obtained using Helly's theorem. Suppose there are n points, and consider the family of closed half-spaces that contain more than dn/(d + 1) of the points. Fewer than n/(d + 1) points are excluded from any one of these halfspaces, so the intersection of any subset of d + 1 of these halfspaces must be nonempty. By Helly's theorem, it follows that the intersection of all of these halfspaces must also be nonempty. Any point in this intersection is necessarily a centerpoint.

Algorithms 
For points in the Euclidean plane, a centerpoint may be constructed in linear time. In any dimension d, a Tukey median (and therefore also a centerpoint) may be constructed in time O(nd − 1 + n log n).

A randomized algorithm that repeatedly replaces sets of d + 2 points by their Radon point can be used to compute an approximation to a centerpoint of any point set, in the sense that its Tukey depth is linear in the sample set size, in an amount of time that is polynomial in both the number of points and the dimension.

References

Citations

Sources 
 .
 .
 .
 .

Euclidean geometry
Multi-dimensional geometry
Means